The Little Hero and the Treasure of Light, also simply known as The Little Hero, is an Uruguayan animated series produced by MTW Studios and broadcast by Canal 4 (Uruguay) in 2006 that reimagined José Artigas along with his friends during his childhood.

Premise 
This animated series deals with the fictional childhood story of José Artigas together with his friends. In the first season the backstory focused on the search for a lost treasure from the shipwreck of the ship "Nuestra Señora de la Luz". On the other hand, the plot of the second season follows the legend of the mythological creature Luison, a werewolf-like creature.

This series portrayed aspects such as the cultural and ethnic diversity of the Banda Oriental at that time, the political and economic interests of that period and depicted the proto-Uruguayan society of that era. In addition, it tried to spread the José Artigas' values as the main character and the idea that any child can be a hero without the necessity of superpowers.

Characters 
Artigas and his friends 
 José Artigas, criollo boy and Uruguayan hero
 Yamandú, Charrúa boy
 Irupé, Charrúa girl
 François, French boy
 Amiri, Afro-Uruguayan boy
Other characters 
 Tacuabé, Charrúa chief
 African prince

Production 
The production of the first season took 10 months at an estimated cost of USD . The traditional Disney-born 24-frame full animation technique was used as the animation method.

Broadcast 
This series consists of 22 5-minute episodes. It was aired in Channel 4 of Montevideo from 9 October 2006, three times a week in the morning and repeated in the afternoon and on Saturday morning. After public request, the broadcast format was changed after the first two weeks, since then broadcasting the previous episode and the current episode alongside each other, so the series broadcast was extended to twelve weeks from the original seven foreseen. The broadcast of the first season ended on 28 December 2006.

The second season aired from 18 June to 9 August 2007 with the same two-episodes per broadcast format.

Awards 
The series was awarded in 2006 with the La República newspapers' Tabaré Prize in the category of Special Award.

Media and merchandising 
Along with the broadcast of the animated series, merchandise of the series was put on sale, including a board game and a puzzle, a play, a story book with exercises. A DVD with the complete series and extras was also released.

See also 

 Television in Uruguay
 History of Uruguay

References 

Uruguayan animated television series
Television series set in the 18th century
Canal 4 (Uruguayan TV channel) original programming